Sand And Sorrow: A New Documentary about Darfur is a 2007 American documentary film about the Darfur crisis that is narrated and co-executive produced by George Clooney. The film is directed by Paul Freedman and uses interviews and footage of human rights activist John Prendergast, Harvard professor Samantha Power and New York Times columnist Nicholas Kristof to depict the origins and the aftermath of the conflict between the Arab and non-Arab tribes in the Darfur region.

See also
 Timeline of the War in Darfur
History of Darfur, for a broader view of the events that have caused the current conflict
Bibliography of the Darfur conflict, for all external links to news coverage, documentaries, advocacy initiatives, and other research on the conflict
International response to the Darfur conflict, for the response of individuals, organizations and governments to the conflict since 2003

External links 
 The official site of the documentary
 

2007 films
American documentary films
Documentary films about the War in Darfur
2007 documentary films
2000s English-language films
2000s American films